This is a list of Slovenian football transfers featuring at least one 2021–22 Slovenian PrvaLiga club which were completed during the 2021–22 winter transfer window.

List

References

External links
PrvaLiga 2021/2022 » Transfers at WorldFootball.net

2021–22 in Slovenian football
Slovenia
Winter 2021-22